The women's 800 metre freestyle competition of the 2018 FINA World Swimming Championships (25 m) was held on 12 and 13 December 2018.

Records
Before the competition, the existing world and championship records were as follows.

Results

Heats
The heats were started on 12 December at 11:25.

Final
The final was held on 13 December at 20:37.

References

Women's 800 metre freestyle